FC Chornomorets-2 Odesa is former football team that was the reserve team of the FC Chornomorets Odesa. It was created out of the Chornomorets reserves team that competed in the Soviet competition in 1992. It was dissolved in 2020.

History
The team was allowed to enter the professional level competition and participate in the First League. In its short history, it performed under par and was taken out of the professional level competitions by 1995. In 1999, it was reformed on the base of the defunct SC Odesa.

Since the creation of the Youth and Reserves competition for the Ukrainian Premier League for 2004–05 season, the team left the Second League and entered the competition for the double teams. Upon relegation of the first squad from the Premier League after 2009–10 season, the team reentered the Second League as Chornomorets-2 Odesa.

The administration of the club decided to remove the club from the 2011–12 Ukrainian Second League during the mid season winter break indicating that there was no benefit having a third professional team. The club played sixteen games in the League and had a record of 5 wins, 5 draws and 6 losses with 19 goals scored and 20 allowed.

Club record

{|class="wikitable"
|-bgcolor="#efefef"
! Season
! Div.
! Pos.
! Pl.
! W
! D
! L
! GS
! GA
! P
!Domestic Cup
!colspan=2|Europe
!Notes
|-
|align=center|-1992
|align=center colspan=13| Soviet football competitions for Reserve squads
|-
|align=center|1992
|align=center|2nd B
|align=center|14
|align=center|26
|align=center|0
|align=center|4
|align=center|22
|align=center|14
|align=center|55
|align=center|5
|align=center|
|align=center|
|align=center|
|align=center bgcolor=red|Relegated
|-
|align=center|1992–93
|align=center|3rd
|align=center|16
|align=center|34
|align=center|8
|align=center|11
|align=center|15
|align=center|36
|align=center|43
|align=center|27
|align=center|Q1 round
|align=center|
|align=center|
|align=center|
|-
|align=center|1993–94
|align=center|3rd
|align=center|11
|align=center|42
|align=center|16
|align=center|7
|align=center|19
|align=center|42
|align=center|55
|align=center|39
|align=center|Q1 round
|align=center|
|align=center|
|align=center|
|-
|align=center|1994–95
|align=center|3rd
|align=center|21
|align=center|42
|align=center|6
|align=center|11
|align=center|25
|align=center|19
|align=center|48
|align=center|29
|align=center|Q3 round
|align=center|
|align=center|
|align=center bgcolor=red|Relegated
|-
|align=center|1995–99
|align=center colspan=13| Team is replaced with Dynamo Odessa, reactivated in 1999 based on SC Odesa
|-
|align=center|1999–2000
|align=center|2nd
|align=center|17
|align=center|34
|align=center|6
|align=center|5
|align=center|23
|align=center|25
|align=center|49
|align=center|23
|align=center|
|align=center|
|align=center|
|align=center bgcolor=red|Relegated
|-
|align=center|2000–01
|align=center|3rd B
|align=center|13
|align=center|28
|align=center|7
|align=center|4
|align=center|17
|align=center|18
|align=center|47
|align=center|25
|align=center|Round of 32*
|align=center|
|align=center|
|align=center|
|-
|align=center|2001–02
|align=center|3rd B
|align=center|12
|align=center|34
|align=center|13
|align=center|7
|align=center|14
|align=center|45
|align=center|40
|align=center|46
|align=center|
|align=center|
|align=center|
|align=center|
|-
|align=center|2002–03
|align=center|3rd B
|align=center|6
|align=center|30
|align=center|11
|align=center|13
|align=center|6
|align=center|42
|align=center|25
|align=center|46
|align=center|
|align=center|
|align=center|
|align=center|
|-
|align=center|2003–04
|align=center|3rd B
|align=center|11
|align=center|30
|align=center|10
|align=center|7
|align=center|13
|align=center|35
|align=center|43
|align=center|37
|align=center|
|align=center|
|align=center|
|align=center|
|-
|align=center|2004–10
|align=center colspan=13| team transformed into Reserve squad
|-
|align=center|2010–11
|align=center|3rd A
|align=center|6
|align=center|22
|align=center|10
|align=center|6
|align=center|6
|align=center|27
|align=center|17
|align=center|36
|align=center|
|align=center|
|align=center|
|align=center|Reactivated
|-
|align=center|2011–12
|align=center|3rd A
|align=center|11
|align=center|16
|align=center|5
|align=center|5
|align=center|16
|align=center|19
|align=center|20
|align=center|20
|align=center|
|align=center|
|align=center|
|align=center bgcolor=pink|Withdrawn
|-
|align=center|2012–
|align=center colspan=13| team transformed into U-19 squad
|}

Coaches
 1992 Vitaliy Sidnev
 1993-1995 Oleksandr Skrypnyk
 1999-2000 Ihor Nakonechnyi
 2000 Valeriy Porkuyan
 2000 Oleh Halytskyi
 2000-2001 Ihor Nakonechnyi
 2002 Oleksandr Spitsyn
 2002-2003 Viktor Sakhno
 2003 Ihor Nehara
 2003 Oleksandr Spitsyn
 2003-2004 Ihor Nehara
 2010-2011 Vladyslav Zubkov

See also
 FC Chornomorets Odesa
 FC Chornomorets Odesa Reserves and Youth Team
 SK Odesa

Notes and references

External links
 Profile

 
FC Chornomorets Odesa
Association football clubs established in 1992
1992 establishments in Ukraine
Ukrainian reserve football teams
Football clubs in Odesa